Robert Vujević (born 26 November 1980 in Esslingen am Neckar, Germany) is a Croatian former professional footballer. He spent two seasons in the Bundesliga with VfB Stuttgart.

References

External links
 

1980 births
Living people
People from Esslingen am Neckar
Footballers from Baden-Württemberg
Sportspeople from Stuttgart (region)
Association football midfielders
Croatian footballers
VfB Stuttgart II players
VfB Stuttgart players
Sportfreunde Siegen players
SSV Reutlingen 05 players
Regionalliga players
Bundesliga players
Oberliga (football) players
Landesliga players